, born 細川貴志 (Hosokawa Takashi) on 15 June 1950, Makkari, Abuta District, Hokkaidō, Japan) is a Japanese enka singer.

In 1975, he debuted with the song "Kokoro Nokori". Hosokawa immediately became one of the most popular enka and pop singers in Japan. He took part in the Kōhaku Uta Gassen for 32 consecutive years, but he was finally forced to reject NHK's offer in 2007 due to the Enten controversy. He returned to take part in the 2009 edition and continued until 2015.

Discography

References

External links 
 Official Website 
 Homepage at Agency 

1950 births
Living people
Japanese male singers
Enka singers
Musicians from Hokkaido